Maurice Boissais is a French writer, winner of Prix Interallié in 1954.

Works 
1947: [https://www.amazon.fr/Maurice-Boissais-Sous-mirabelliers-Illustrations/dp/B0018HSTSY Sous les mirabelliers, Éditions de l'amitié] (collection of tales from Lorraine)
1954: '', Éditions Julliard, Prix Interallié.

20th-century French non-fiction writers
20th-century French male writers
Prix Interallié winners